Paul Stuart Auerbach  (January 4, 1951 – June 23, 2021) was an American physician and author in the academic discipline of wilderness medicine. He was the founder and past president of the Wilderness Medical Society. Auerbach was the editor for the Journal of Wilderness Medicine (currently Wilderness and Environmental Medicine) published by the Wilderness Medical Society from 1990 to 1995. Auerbach was also the author of a number of articles and books on topics such as emergency medicine, hazardous marine animals, and scuba diving, including two books of underwater photography.

Background
Auerbach was born  in Plainfield, New Jersey. He graduated from North Plainfield High School in 1969. Auerbach then went to Duke University located in Durham, North Carolina, where he completed a Bachelor of Arts in religion, graduating magna cum laude in 1973.

Auerbach received his Doctorate of Medicine from the Duke University School of Medicine in 1977. Auerbach then went on to Dartmouth Hitchcock Medical Center and completed his clinical internship in 1978 before starting a residency in emergency medicine at the University of California, Los Angeles Medical Center. Upon completion of his residency in 1980, Auerbach became board certified in emergency medicine by the American Board of Emergency Medicine in 1981.

Auerbach later went on to complete a Master of Science in management as a Sloan Fellow at the Stanford Graduate School of Business. He died on June 23, 2021, from brain cancer at the age of 70.

Career
From 1980 to 1981, Auerbach was an assistant professor of medicine at the Temple University School of Medicine in Philadelphia, Pennsylvania. He then went on to become assistant clinical professor of medicine at the University of California, San Francisco until 1985 when he moved to the Vanderbilt University School of Medicine in Nashville, Tennessee. Vanderbilt promoted Auerbach to professor in 1991 and later that year he moved to the Stanford University School of Medicine. Auerbach served as the chief, Division of Emergency Medicine, Department of Surgery at the Stanford University School of Medicine from 1991 to 1995. Auerbach served as the Redlich Family Professor of Surgery in the Division of Emergency Medicine at Stanford School of Medicine, Stanford University.

Awards
Awards received by Auerbach include:
 DAN America Award, Divers Alert Network (1998)
 Outstanding Contribution in Education Award, American College of Emergency Physicians (1999)
 NOGI Award for Science, the Academy of Underwater Arts and Sciences (2007)
 Founders Award, Wilderness Medical Society (2000)
 Hero of Emergency Medicine, American College of Emergency Physicians (2008)
 Diver of the Year, Beneath the Sea (2008)
 DAN/Rolex Diver of the Year, Divers Alert Network (2009)

Publications
Auerbach was the editor for the Journal of Wilderness Medicine (currently Wilderness and Environmental Medicine) published by the Wilderness Medical Society from 1990 to 1995 when he became the Editor Emeritus. Editorial boards that he has served on have included Topics in Emergency Medicine (1981–2006), The Journal of Emergency Medicine (1985–1986), Current Concepts in Wound Care. (1986–1988), Emergindex (1992–2002), Annals of Emergency Medicine (1988–1991), and European Journal of Emergency Medicine (1993–2006). He served on the editorial board for Emergency Medicine Reports (1986–20??). Auerbach was on the consulting editorial board for the Journal of Emergency Nursing from 1981 to 1985. He has also served as the contributing medical editor for several diving publications including Dive Data (1987), Scuba Times (1988), The Undersea Journal (1988), and Dive Training (1991).

Books
 
 
 
 
 
 
 
 
-Lemery, Jay; Enviromedics: The Impact of Climate Change on Human Health. Rowman & Littlefield Publishers. 2017.

Abstracts

Patents
 1989

References

External links
 Paul Auerbach's Blog

1951 births
2021 deaths
American medical researchers
American medical writers
American male non-fiction writers
American photographers
American underwater divers
North Plainfield High School alumni
People from North Plainfield, New Jersey
University of California, Los Angeles faculty
Stanford Sloan Fellows
Underwater photographers
High-altitude medicine physicians
Duke University alumni
Angier B. Duke Scholars
Duke University School of Medicine alumni